Mysterium fidei may refer to:

 Mysterium fidei (encyclical),  1965 papal encyclical on the Eucharist by Pope Paul VI
 "The mystery of faith" or "a mystery of faith", phrases found in various religious contexts
 Mysterium fidei, title of the principal work of Maurice de la Taille (1872–1933)

See also
 Memorial Acclamation, an acclamation following the Eucharist that uses the phrase
 Words of Institution, Eucharist liturgies sometimes using the phase
 Catechism of the Catholic Church, a book of catechism that includes celebration of Christian mystery
 Sacred mysteries, supernatural phenomena associated with divinity or religion
 Mysterium (disambiguation)
 Fidei (disambiguation)

Latin religious words and phrases